The All Japan National Railway Locomotive Engineers' Union (Zendōrō) was a trade union representing railway workers in Japan.

The union's origins lay in the National Railway Locomotive Engineers' Union (Dōrō).  In 1973, Dōrō's leadership called for votes for the Socialist Party of Japan, but a minority group preferred to back the Communist Party of Japan (KPJ).  This group was expelled, and in 1974 founded Zendoro.  By 1975, the new union had 3,500 members, but this steadily declined, and by 1990, membership was down to only 1,401.  It remained unaffiliated until 1989, when it joined the new National Confederation of Trade Unions.  In 1999, it merged with the Construction and Rural and General Workers' Union and the All Japan Transport and General Workers' Union, to form the All Japan Construction, Transport and General Workers' Union.

References

Trade unions established in 1974
Trade unions disestablished in 1999
Railway unions in Japan
1974 establishments in Japan
1999 disestablishments in Japan